So Wound is the second (and last) album by the Halifax (Nova Scotia) rock band Jale, released in 1996 on Sub Pop Records. A consciously more power-pop album than its predecessor, Dreamcake, So Wound received critical praise but failed to make significant radio impact.

Shortly after the release of So Wound, the band split up.

Critical reception
Ira Robbins, in Trouser Press, wrote: "Appreciably elevating the band’s skill and confidence levels from indie pop cuteness to real contention (while upholding the lyrical fortitude), the album is a taut, purposeful marvel of great pop songs in a number of cohesively connected modes."

Track listing
 "Ali"
 "Hey Hey"
 "Sign of Life"
 "All Ready"
 "Tumble"
 "Blue"
 "Mosquito"
 "Storm"
 "Drag"
 "Back on Track"
 "Over You"
 "Despite"
 "Superstar"

Hidden track
Approximately fifteen seconds after the end of "Superstar" there is an unlisted track, informally known as "Sentimental."

References

Sub Pop albums
1996 albums
Jale albums
albums produced by Brad Wood